July Rhapsody is a 2002 Hong Kong drama film directed by Ann Hui and produced by Ann Hui and Derek Yee.

Overview 
The film's Chinese title  literally translates to Man, 40. Its alternative title is Laam yan sei sap. The film explores midlife crisis, marriage, and teacher-student seduction.

Plot
Lam Yiu-kwok (Jacky Cheung), a Hong Kong secondary school teacher, is facing a mid-life crisis, marriage problems, and seduction by a student. He and his wife Man-ching (Anita Mui) are married, living in a modest apartment with their two sons. However, his first son Yue (Eric Kot) is not his, but from his wife and Mr. Seng (Tou Chung Hua), their former teacher. When Man-ching was a student, she seduced Mr. Seng, her teacher. As a teacher, Lam Yiu-kwok does not have financial success like his friends, successful businessmen and professionals who flaunt their extravagant lifestyles at reunion dinners. Lam Yiu-kwok's wife's ex-lover Mr. Seng returns to Hong Kong. Mr. Seng is old and dying and she is obliged to spend time with her ex-lover. In school, Lam Yiu-kwok receives flirtatious attention from Choi-lam (Karena Lam), a student from his class who has a crush on him. Lam Yiu-kwok's resistance from his raunchy student begins to weaken.

Cast
 Jacky Cheung as Lam Yiu-kwok
Otto Wu as Young Lam Yiu-kwok
 Anita Mui as Chan Man-ching. This was Anita Mui's second final film appearance before her death from cervical cancer in 2003.
Cara Chu as Young Chan Man-ching
 Karena Lam as Woo Choi-lam 
 Shaun Tam as Lam On-yin
Ricky Kwok as Infant Lam On-yin
 Eric Kot as Wong Yui 
 Tou Chung-hua as Sheng Sai-nin
 Jin Hui as Lam Lui-yin
 Leung Tin as Principal Leung
 Race Wong as Mrs. Mak
 Ku Tin-nung as Yiu-kwok's alumnus
 Roddy Wong as Yiu-kwok's alumnus
 Jason Yip as Yiu-kwok's alumnus
 Simon Li as Yiu-kwok's alumnus
 Raymond Yu as Yiu-kwok's alumnus
 James Cheng as Yiu-kwok's alumnus
 Yu Sai-tang as Cho
 Alan Wong as Cho's son
 Wong Yuet-ling as Waiter
 Chan Kui-fai as P.E. teacher
 Lee Yiu-tong as Teacher
 Ng Ka-leung as Teacher
 Law Wai-yee as Teacher
 Li Chui-yee as Teacher
 Fok Bo as Teacher
 Tony Lui as Teacher
 Chan Kin-shun as Teacher
 Nakata Yuki as Japanese girl
 Chow Au-ming as Old man
 Lau Miu-ling as Filipino maid
 Lee Tung-yung as Mainland female doctor
 Cheung Lai-kwan as Tramp in tunnel
 Jonathan Lam
 Ho Tsz-kit
 Carson Fan
 William Ho
 Roy Lau
 Jason Lee
 Levan Mak
 Courtney Wu as Father
 Ko Tin Lung

Awards and nominations

See also 
 Summer Snow

References

External links
 July Rhapsody at mui-mui.org (via archive.org)

 July Rahapsody at hkcinemagic.org
 July Rahapsody at sffs.org
 July Rhapsody at filmasia.net
 July Rhapsody at independentvinemaoffice.org.uk
 Nan Ren Si Shi / July Rhapsody ad t mostra.org

2002 films
2002 drama films
Hong Kong drama films
Midlife crisis films
2000s Cantonese-language films
Films directed by Ann Hui
Films about scandalous teacher–student relationships
Adultery in films
Films set in Hong Kong
Films shot in Hong Kong
2000s Hong Kong films